Ust-Lebed (Kuu-Oozı) is a rural locality (a selo) in Turochakskoye Rural Settlement of Turochaksky District, the Altai Republic, Russia. The population was 2 as of 2016. There is 1 street.

Geography 
Ust-Lebed is located at the confluence of the Lebed and Biya Rivers, 11 km northwest of Turochak (the district's administrative centre) by road. Lebedskoye is the nearest rural locality.

References 

Rural localities in Turochaksky District